Malalai Shinwari is a member of the Wolesi Jirga for Kabul Province, Afghanistan.
Shinwari was a journalist prior to running for office.

Shinwari ranked first in votes among female candidates in Kabul. She has been an advocate for the rights of women in Afghanistan.
On July 10, 2007 USA Today quoted Shinwari's opposition to the practice of selling daughters in marriage in order to pay off family debts.

Writings
sat at home malalai shinwari

References

Afghan journalists
Members of the House of the People (Afghanistan)
21st-century Afghan women politicians
21st-century Afghan politicians
Living people
Pashtun women
Year of birth missing (living people)